Jaxa (Polish: Jaxa, Jaksa) was a 17th-century microstate in North Asia with its capital in Albazino existing between 1665 and 1674. It was located on the border of the Tsardom of Russia and Qing China, by the Amur river. Its population was made by from Polish and Ukrainian refugees from the Tsardom of Russia, and the indigenous Evenks and Daurs. It was established from the territory of the Tsardom of Russia in 1665 by Nikifor Chernigovsky and his men, who fled Russia, and existed until 1674 when it was incorporated back to that country.

Name
The name of Jaxa originates from the wooden stronghold of Jaxa built by Nikifor Chernigovsky in place of Albazino that was destroyed by Chinese troops. The name of the fort was derived from the founder's family Coat of Arms, Gryf coat of arms. According to Chinese sources, this place was called 雅克薩 (yakesa) before the rise of Albazino.

History
The state was created by Nikifor Chernigovsky, a Polish nobleman deported from Volhynia. In 1665 Chernigovsky and Siberian Cossacks killed the voivode of Ust-Ilimsk. In order to hide in it, they rebuilt the abandoned stronghold of Albazino, thereby making it the capital of their new state. In 1685 Jaxa was annexed by Qing China.

Albazin

Thereafter it was little used as the Russians concentrated on the richer grain-growing lands downriver. In 1652 the Qing dynasty drove the Russians out of the Amur region and the land was left to outlaws and adventurers.

Foundation of Jaxa
In 1655 Nikifor Chernigovsky, a Pole who had been exiled to Siberia after an unsuccessful attempt to run away from the Russians' custody, murdered the voivode of Ilimsk in retaliation for the rape of his daughter, and fled to the Amur where he reoccupied the ruins of Albazin and gathered a band of supporters. Chernigovsky soon gained the support of the local population, Tungusic people, for whom treatment with respect was a great change in comparison to several assaults they had endured under Russian (Cossacks) sovereignty. He built a major stronghold on the ruins of Albazin giving it the name of Jaxa.

In the coming years, Siberian governors made several failed attempts to regain the control over Albazin; however, Chernigovsky was able to keep his position playing the Russians off against the Chinese and vice versa. From 1669, the Russian tsar received a tribute from the Jaxa country (Albazin and surrounding villages), which impacted the tsar's decision to formally acknowledge Chernigovsky as the lord of Jaxa in 1674. In communication with Chernigovsky, the Chinese government used Polish as the main language. In 1675 he raided Chinese lands with the help of the local population. This is the last recorded reference to Chernigovsky in history.

The Russian-Chinese conflict over Albazin

The Qing dynasty did little about Albazin because their forces were tied up in southern China and because they were concerned about possible Russian backing for their enemies in Mongolia. With the southern problem nearly solved (Taiwan was conquered in 1683), in the spring of 1682 the Kangxi Emperor made a tour through Manchuria and began preparations to deal with the Amur problem. His plan was to build up such a large force that the Russians would withdraw without fighting, for, as he said "The use of force is not a good thing. We use it only under compulsion." Troops were moved up to Aigun and crops were planted to feed them. An attack was delayed due to disagreements among the planners and the difficulty of moving supplies northward.

From 1681 there were Qing threats against Albazin, talks were held on the Nun River and minor Russian forts were destroyed along the Zeya. By the end of 1683, all Russian bases except Albazin had been eliminated. Moscow responded by making Ivan Vlasov voyevoda of Nerchinsk and appointing Akeksey Tolbuzin to a new voivodeship at Albazin (July 1684). An attempt to move men and supplies east failed due to shortages and inefficiency.

The siege began on June 23, 1685. On the June 26 there was an indecisive day-long battle. Qing troops thereupon piled dry wood along the fort's wooden walls and when they began to light it, Tolbuzin surrendered (exact date uncertain). The 600 or so defenders were allowed to withdraw to Nerchinsk. About 45 opted to go with the Qing troops where they joined the Albazinians in Peking. Qing troops burned the fort and withdrew, but did not destroy the crops. When news of the defeat reached Moscow in November it was decided to abandon the Amur and send an ambassador to Peking.

In 1686, one day after leaving Albazin, the retreating Russians met a group of reinforcements who brought word that an even larger group under Baiton had reached Nerchinsk. Since the fort was lost they continued their withdrawal. Sometime after July 10, 1685, scouts reported that Qing troops were gone and the crops still standing. Vlasov sent 669 well-armed men under Tolbuzin to gather the harvest. The crops were gathered, Albazin was refortified with earthen walls and efforts were made to bring the natives back into subjection. Qing troops arrived on July 18, 1686, and began a tight siege and a steady cannonade. On the fifth day of the siege, Tolbuzin was killed by a cannonball and replaced by Afanasii Baiton. The Russians had enough food to last until Easter, but were short of water. The siege continued until early winter. In late October messengers arrived in Peking announcing Moscow's desire to negotiate. An order was issued to relax the siege. At this time less than 66 men, out of an original 826, were left alive (most had died of disease, especially scurvy). On December 25 Baiton sent one of his men to request provisions. A few more than twenty men remained in the fort, all ill and undernourished. When, in August 1687, the Kangxi Emperor heard (incorrectly) that the Russian ambassador had reached Mongolia, he ordered the Qing troops withdrawn.

By the Treaty of Nerchinsk in 1689, Albazin was abandoned and destroyed. The former territory of Jaxa was incorporated into the Qing dynasty of China.

References

1665 establishments in Asia
1674 disestablishments in Asia
States and territories established in 1665
States and territories disestablished in 1674
Former countries in Chinese history
China–Russian Empire relations
History of Manchuria
History of Siberia
Amur Oblast (Russian Empire)
Microstates